Han Jingna (born 16 January 1975) is a Chinese retired badminton player who rated among the world's leading women's singles players in the 1990s. Han began practicing badminton at the age of seven. Two years later, she trained at the sports school in Wuhan. She was selected to join the Hubei team in 1988 when she was thirteen, and to join the national team in 1989. She was part of national teams that clinched the 1995 Sudirman Cup in Lausanne, and the 1998 Uber Cup in  Hong Kong, She won the silver medal for women's singles at the 1995 World Championships by upsetting South Korea's Bang Soo-hyun in the semifinals before falling to Chinese teammate Ye Zhaoying in the finals. Han also earned a singles bronze medal at the next World Championships in 1997. She competed in the women's singles competition at the 1996 Olympic Games but was eliminated in the quarterfinals round by the defending Olympic gold medalist Susi Susanti of Indonesia.

In 1999, she left the national team and went to the United Kingdom  to help coach Great Britain's team for 2000 Olympic Games.
She later worked as a Chinese national youth team coach starting in 2006.

Achievements

World Championships 
Women's singles

Asian Cup 
Women's singles

World Junior Championships 
Girls' doubles

IBF World Grand Prix 
The World Badminton Grand Prix sanctioned by International Badminton Federation (IBF) from 1983 to 2006.

Women's singles

Women's doubles

IBF International 
Women's singles

Mixed doubles

References

External links 
 
 

1975 births
Living people
Badminton players from Wuhan
Chinese female badminton players
Badminton players at the 1996 Summer Olympics
Olympic badminton players of China
Badminton players at the 1994 Asian Games
Asian Games bronze medalists for China
Asian Games medalists in badminton
Medalists at the 1994 Asian Games
Chinese expatriate sportspeople in the United Kingdom
Chinese badminton coaches
21st-century Chinese women
20th-century Chinese women